Markus Lehmann (born 9 March 1960) is a Swiss gymnast. He competed in eight events at the 1984 Summer Olympics.

References

External links
 

1960 births
Living people
Swiss male artistic gymnasts
Olympic gymnasts of Switzerland
Gymnasts at the 1984 Summer Olympics
Place of birth missing (living people)